Thermoniphas micylus, the tinted blue or the common chalk blue, is a butterfly in the family Lycaenidae. It is found in Guinea, Sierra Leone, Liberia, Ivory Coast, Ghana, Togo, Nigeria (south and the Cross River loop) and western Cameroon. The habitat consists of forest edges, paths and clearings.

Both sexes are attracted to flowers.

References

Butterflies described in 1780
Thermoniphas